Not be confused with Mike DeCarlo.

Michael DeCarlo (born in Toronto, Ontario) is a Canadian television director. Some of his directing credits include Queer as Folk, Murdoch Mysteries, The Zack Files, Across the River to Motor City, Wild Roses, The Border, Three Moons Over Milford, Kyle XY and Rogue.

In 2012, DeCarlo wrote, directed, and co-executive produced Two Hands to Mouth, a Canadian dark comedy drama film with an ensemble cast, his first feature film.

References

External links

Canadian television directors
Living people
People from Toronto
Year of birth missing (living people)